Tycoon is a business simulation game for 1 to 5 players by David Bohlke for the TRS-80 Model I Level II and published by The Software Exchange.

Gameplay
Tycoon is a game in which the player manages and makes financial decisions for a large business to increase the player's total worth and become a tycoon.

Reception
J. Mishcon reviewed Tycoon in The Space Gamer No. 30. Mishcon commented that "As currently constituted, I'd advised against this game, but a second edition with more complete instructions (and perhaps some non-financial complications for extreme tactics) would be very interesting." In a SoftSide review, Brad Cameron wrote, "Buy this—it is the player's skillful decisions that may win them the game, as there are many different strategies to use."

References

1980 video games
TRS-80 games
TRS-80-only games
Video games developed in the United States